The name Tokage has been used to name four tropical cyclones in the northwestern Pacific Ocean. The name was contributed by Japan and is the Japanese word for Lacerta or lizard.
 Typhoon Tokage (2004) (T0423, 27W, Siony) – struck Japan.
 Tropical Storm Tokage (2011) (T1107, 09W, Hanna)
 Tropical Storm Tokage (2016) (T1625, 29W, Marce)
 Typhoon Tokage (2022) (T2210, 11W) – remained out at sea.

Pacific typhoon set index articles